Popice is a municipality and village in Břeclav District in the South Moravian Region of the Czech Republic. It has about 1,000 inhabitants.

History
The first written mention of Popice is from 1291, when the village was sold to the convent in Dolní Kounice.

References

External links

Villages in Břeclav District